The 1949 Louisiana Tech Bulldogs football team was an American football team that represented the Louisiana Polytechnic Institute (now known as Louisiana Tech University) as a member of the Gulf States Conference during the 1949 college football season. In their ninth year under head coach Joe Aillet, the team compiled a 7–2 record and as Gulf States Conference champion.

Schedule

References

Louisiana Tech
Louisiana Tech Bulldogs football seasons
Louisiana Tech Bulldogs football